Dorling Kindersley Limited (branded as DK) is a British multinational publishing company specialising in illustrated reference books for adults and children in 63 languages. 
It is part of Penguin Random House, a subsidiary of German media conglomerate Bertelsmann.
Established in 1974, DK publishes a range of titles in genres including travel (including DK Eyewitness travel), history, geography, science, space, nature, sports, gardening, cookery and parenting.  
The worldwide co-CEOs of DK is Paul Kelly and Rebecca Smart. DK has offices in New York, Melbourne, London, Munich, New Delhi, Toronto, Madrid, Beijing, and Jiangmen.
DK works with licensing partners such as Disney, LEGO, DC Comics, the Royal Horticultural Society, MasterChef, and the Smithsonian Institution. 
DK has commissioned Mary Berry, Monty Don, Robert Winston, Huw Richards, and Steve Mould for a range of books.

History

DK was founded in 1974 by Christopher Dorling and Peter Kindersley in London as a book packager. Its first book as a publisher in the UK was First Aid Manual for the British voluntary medical services. DK Inc. began publishing in the United States in 1991. That same year, Microsoft bought a 26 percent stake in DK. In 1996, DK hired Neal Porter, Richard Jackson and Melanie Kroupa from Orchard Books to start the DK Ink imprint, but Grolier sued the trio. DK and Grolier settled the lawsuit.

In 1999, DK overestimated the market for Star Wars books and was left with millions of unsold copies, resulting in crippling debt. As a direct result, DK was taken over the following year by the Pearson plc media company and made part of Penguin Group, which also owned the Penguin Books label. DK has continued to sell Star Wars books after the takeover.

In 2013, Bertelsmann and Pearson completed a merger to form Penguin Random House. Bertelsmann owned 53% and Pearson 47% of the company. Penguin's trade publishing activity continued to include DK under the newly formed Penguin Random House. 
In July 2017, Pearson agreed to sell a 22% stake in the business to Bertelsmann, thereby retaining a 25% holding.
In December 2019, Bertelsmann agreed to acquire Pearson's 25% in Penguin Random House, and therefore DK, making it a wholly owned subsidiary of Bertelsmann.
In 2019, Prima Games was sold to Asteri Holdings.

Publications

DK publishes a range of titles internationally for adults and children. Most of the company's books are produced by teams of editors, designers and  cartographers who work with freelance writers and illustrators. Some are endorsed by "imprimaturs": such as the British Medical Association, the Royal Horticultural Society and the British Red Cross.

BradyGames
BradyGames was a publishing company in the United States operating as a DK imprint, which specializes in video game strategy guides, covering multiple video game platforms. It published its first strategy guide in November 1993 as a division of MacMillan Computer Publishing. In 1998, Simon & Schuster (which acquired Macmillan in 1994) divested BradyGames as part of its educational division to Pearson plc. BradyGames has grown to publish roughly 90-100 guides per year.

On 1 June 2015, BradyGames merged with Prima Games, and future strategy guides made by the publishing company were published under the Prima Games label, which was sold to Asteri Holdings in 2019.

Young adult
DK commenced publishing books aimed at teens with the release of Heads Up Psychology in 2014.

See also 

 Cartopedia

References

External links 

 DK website

Book publishing companies of the United Kingdom
Travel guide books
Publishing companies established in 1974
Penguin Random House
Kindersley family
Former Microsoft subsidiaries